Just Jug is a live album by saxophonists Gene Ammons recorded in Chicago in 1961 and originally released on the Argo label in 1962. The album was subsequently rereleased as Gene Ammons Live! in Chicago with two bonus tracks on the Prestige label.

Reception
AllMusic reviewer Scott Yanow stated: "This is one of many Gene Ammons recordings from the 1961–62 period; virtually all are worth getting".

Track listing 
All compositions by Gene Ammons, except as indicated
"Scrapple from the Apple" (Charlie Parker) – 5:17
"Falling in Love With Love" (Lorenz Hart, Richard Rodgers) – 4:44
"Please Send Me Someone to Love" (Percy Mayfield) – 5:08
"Sweet Georgia Brown" (Ben Bernie, Kenneth Casey, Maceo Pinkard) – 4:24
"It Could Happen to You" (Johnny Burke, Jimmy Van Heusen) – 4:21
"Foot Tappin'" – 6:51
"Jug's Blue Blues" – 5:39
"Fast Track" – 4:02
"C Jam Blues" (Barney Bigard, Duke Ellington) – 8:08 Bonus track on Gene Ammons Live! in Chicago CD reissue
"But Not for Me" (George Gershwin, Ira Gershwin) – 5:33 Bonus track on Gene Ammons Live! in Chicago CD reissue

Personnel 
Gene Ammons – tenor saxophone
Eddie Buster – organ
Gerald Donovan – drums

References 

1962 live albums
Argo Records live albums
Gene Ammons live albums
Prestige Records live albums